In baseball statistics, walks plus hits per inning pitched (WHIP) is a sabermetric measurement of the number of baserunners a pitcher has allowed per inning pitched. WHIP is calculated by adding the number of walks and hits allowed and dividing this sum by the number of innings pitched.

WHIP reflects a pitcher's propensity for allowing batters to reach base, therefore a lower WHIP indicates better performance. 

While earned run average (ERA) measures the runs a pitcher gives up, WHIP more directly measures a pitcher's effectiveness against batters. Like ERA, WHIP accounts for pitcher performance regardless of errors and unearned runs.

History

The stat was invented in 1979 by writer Daniel Okrent, who called the metric "innings pitched ratio" at the time. Okrent excluded hit batsmen from the numerator of baserunners allowed since Sunday newspapers did not include hit batsmen in their agate box scores. 

WHIP is one of the few sabermetric statistics to enter mainstream baseball usage. In addition to its use in live games, the WHIP is one of the most commonly used statistics in fantasy baseball, and is standard in fantasy leagues that employ 4×4, 5×5, and 6×6 formats.

Leaders
WHIP near 1.00 or lower over the course of a season will often rank among the league leaders in Major League Baseball (MLB).

The lowest single-season WHIP in MLB history through 2018 is 0.7373 from Pedro Martínez pitching for the Boston Red Sox in 2000, which broke the previous record of 0.7692 of Guy Hecker of the Louisville Eclipse in 1882. Walter Johnson, with a 0.7803 WHIP in 1913, has the third-lowest single-season WHIP.

Cleveland Guardians right-handed pitcher Addie Joss held the MLB record for the lowest career WHIP as of 2018, with a 0.9678 WHIP in 2,327 innings. Chicago White Sox spitballer Ed Walsh was second, with a 0.9996 WHIP in 2,964 innings, the lowest career WHIP for a qualified pitcher with 10 or more seasons pitched. Reliever Mariano Rivera ranked third among qualified pitchers with a career WHIP of 1.0003 in 1,283 innings. Los Angeles Dodgers left-handed pitcher Clayton Kershaw was fourth with a WHIP of 1.0046.

See also
List of Major League Baseball career WHIP leaders

References

Notes

External links
Baseball's single-season WHIP leaders
Baseball's all-time WHIP leaders

Pitching statistics